The Royal Automobile Association of South Australia (RAA) is a South Australian automobile club who provides a range of member services. Their services include: 24-hour emergency breakdown, insurance, vehicle inspection, member advocacy, road safety, motoring road rules information service, technical advice, travel services, tour planning and accommodation bookings.

RAA services operate on a break-even basis and the organisation looks to generate profit through its commercial and investment activities.

RAA began as the Automobile and Motor Cycling Club of South Australia in 1903, and by 1904 had amended its name by deleting the words ‘Motor Cycling’. In 1911 the club was reconstituted as an association and in 1928 received its Royal patronage. In 1959 the association changed its logo from AA of SA to RAA.

The head office of the Royal Automobile Association is located at the north-eastern corner of the South Road-Richmond Road intersection, in the Adelaide suburb of Mile End South.  Originally the head office was located in Hindmarsh Square in the Adelaide central business district. RAA has branch offices located throughout the Adelaide metropolitan area – as well as in South Australian regional centres.

Road service
RAA offers several membership types, including Premium, Plus, Standard and Fleet Membership. RAA benefits are not restricted to South Australia, with members having access to affiliate organisations interstate and overseas including RACV, RACQ, RACWA, RACT, NRMA and AANT.

RAA patrols respond to more than 400,000 calls for emergency roadside assistance each year – with over 90% of problems fixed at the roadside. The primary aim of the patrol is to get vehicles going again. If that is not possible, RAA will organise for the vehicles to be towed.

RAA Premium and Plus members are entitled to an unlimited number of calls for roadside assistance with Standard members allowed four calls per year.

History

1903 to 1928

On 30 September 1903 a small group of South Australian motoring enthusiasts established a social motoring club, calling itself the Automobile and Motor Cycling Club.

These pioneers embarked on weekend drives in the Adelaide Hills, hill climbs and reliability trials; forming motorsport in South Australia. At the time there were no garages and drivers (or Good Samaritans) had to fix any problems on their own.

As motorists were reigned in for the first time with regulations, RAA took on the role of the motorists' watchdog, which has continued to this day. That had a sting in its tail though, for a growing gulf between the sports-minded members and those concerned with more serious matters caused a split in around 1910, which brought RAA close to a premature demise.

What followed was a determination to concentrate on practical help for members, and the Automobile Club (as RAA was called then) became an association. RAA opposed speed limits (still as low as 4 mph in places by the 1920s), and the revenue-raising tactics of police speed traps. This prompted a response from South Australians – an increase in membership possibly without equal in the world – a growth of 1,379 per cent in the decade from 1920.

Proliferating speeding prosecutions led to the introduction of free road rules advice for members (the first formal service) as early as 1911. Other member benefits included a list of country hotels and the production of the state's first detailed road map. In 1913 it also began direction signposting.

Early in the 1920s the association was restructured to become a fully-fledged service organisation. Staffing levels grew from zero early in 1920 to about three dozen by the end of the decade. By then, Road Service, Technical, Touring and Motoring Road Rules services were established and the RAA Motor Insurance Policy was in place.

In 1928 the association was granted the prefix 'Royal' by King George V, a sign of recognition from England and the State Government (which had to approve the application first) with which it was still having bitter battles. This acknowledged the association's role in guiding the State into a radically new era, and its tireless work (particularly that of its members) providing transport for wounded and sick soldiers returning from the battlefields of Europe during World War I.

1929 to 1963

RAA bought its first freehold office at 49 Hindmarsh Square, Adelaide and moved in during 1928, shortly before the 20,000th member was enrolled. Following the outbreak of World War II, RAA formed and operated the Civil Defense Transport Auxiliary, surveyed and mapped the state's roads for the military authorities, provided research into alternative fuels and supported the cause in other ways. The period of austerity and hard times were caused by increasingly tough petrol rationing and unprecedented inflation.

By 1947 the motoring organisations knew that rationing was no longer necessary and campaigned to have it removed. Prime Minister Ben Chifley refused and, to a backdrop of RAA accusations that petrol was being used as a political weapon, Chifley was defeated in an election at the end of 1949. The in-coming Government quickly removed rationing.

Since the early 1920s, RAA called for a single Road Traffic Act to replace about a dozen different Acts and hundreds of regulations. RAA was a participant on the committee which put together the Act, which came into force in 1937.

The early 1950s saw a massive increase in car ownership and spiraling RAA membership, soaring past 75,000. Road Service changed, with the familiar motor cycle outfits replaced by vans, and the Guides became Patrols and started using two-way radio, operating 24 hours a day out of new premises in North Adelaide.

By RAA's Golden Jubilee in 1950 there were 140 staff, supported by seven country offices and 99 road service depots. Service figures for 1953 showed 66,000 road service jobs, almost 40,000 touring enquiries, 12,000 vehicle inspections, 84,000 technical enquiries, 1,300 motoring road rules enquiries, almost a thousand court defenses, and 20,000 insurance policies.

In 1959 the association changed its logo from the Automobile Association of SA to RAA.

Through its member services – such as emergency road service and touring – the association has become an established South Australian icon.

1954 to 1978

As motoring and membership grew, RAA moved into larger headquarters, built new technical premises, began its office and vehicle inspection centres in the suburbs, established staffed offices in major country areas and started its march into the computer age.

If this was the State's most potent period of motoring growth though, by the 1970s it was balanced by less buoyant issues. There were fears that the world was running out of crude oil, growing concerns about pollution and differing opinions on the development of freeways and, indeed, on the future of the motor car.

Under a backdrop of ever-increasing taxes and charges, RAA fought to improve petrol-selling hours in Adelaide, lobbied for the city's first major off-street parking, and battled to get the Eyre Highway sealed. It succeeded with all three, and kept an eye on other new features like parking meters, speed radar, seat belts and breathalysers. Member services continued to evolve and improve. RAA Travel Service, Driver Training, Travellers Shop and Finance Service all began in this period, while an in-house Motoring Road Rules service began the advisory service previously handled by the solicitors.

The Touring Department planned caravan parks and initiated the 'star' grading accommodation classification scheme which is still used and published its first touring guide books. Late in the 1950s, RAA employed its first cartographer and began drawing in-house the regional maps from which today's maps take their lineage.

A notable casualty of the 1970s was RAA's role of providing much of the state's road signposting, a task it had handled for over half a century. In these inflationary times the cost was escalating alarmingly, and the last straw was the prospect of metric conversion when distances changed from miles to kilometres.

RAA rode on that wave of expansion and social development. It had a mighty impact in fact, for in this quarter century its membership almost quadrupled to 357,000, and cemented RAA's position as one of the state's most influential organisations.

1979 to 2010

As the 1980s began, South Australia had an uncertain economy that at times slid into recession. This more competitive era saw the association expand its own services and combat competition in areas like emergency road service.

The most important advance in membership benefits since the start of the service era was the introduction in 1987 of RAA Plus, whose benefits proved so popular with South Australians that almost 30 per cent of members now choose the Plus option.

RAA was the first motoring organisation in the world to introduce a battery replacement service and the first in Australia to produce a computer CD with touring information – the TravelGuide CD-ROM. During the 1980s the Mapping Department moved from pen-and-ink drawing to an improved process known as scribing and then to computer mapping. Brand-new operations included the Approved Repair Service and RAA Security Services.

Emergency road service was based at three different locations since 1979 and, like most operations, became heavily dependent on computer technology. Together with Technical Services, it was a prime consideration when a new property at Mile End was constructed which has since become the association's headquarters. Today the Richmond Road facility now includes a branch office, Child Safety Centre and Vehicle Inspection Centre.

Growing concern over car theft led to initiatives like RAA's steering wheel lock and the full metal jacket to make cars more difficult to steal, and a vehicle etching scheme to deter professional thieves. This ongoing campaign culminated in the association organising a Vehicle Theft Summit in 2000. Similarly, the quest to lower the number of deaths and injuries on the roads resulted in the RAA Road Safety Summit during the same year.

The association's quest for improved roads played a part in achieving the sealing of the Stuart Highway and the creation of the new Crafers Highway and Southern Expressway.

With membership soaring past half a million, RAA reached a point where its standing in South Australia and its resources allowed it to put back into the community some of the support which the community had for so long given the association.

It contributed 100 baby capsules, for example, to an infant restraint hire scheme, it has sponsored alternative energy initiatives including the annual Pedal Prix and solar powered vehicles, it introduced RAA Family Car of the Year, which has since been incorporated into the national awards for Australia's Best Cars, and it participates in the ANCAP crash testing program in search of safer motoring.

By the start of 2010, total membership was 580,000, almost 61% of the state's 953,948 licensed drivers.

Since RAA's 100-year anniversary in 2003, the organisation has continued along a path of continued improvement and modernization. This was reflected in the occupation of the third and final stage of the new headquarters at Mile End in 2004. While in 2009, the city branch returned to its historical and sentimental home at 41 Hindmarsh Square, with the site having been extensively redeveloped into a green, environmentally friendly complex.

In 2007, RAA's second longest serving and well loved Chief Executive, John Fotheringham, retired after 19 years in the role due to health problems, with Ian Stone appointed as his successor.

The start of 2010 has seen improvements made to the website www.raa.com.au, transforming it into an interactive tool rather than a site for information – all aimed at benefiting members. The association has also refreshed the RAA brand, now looking towards the future.

In terms of advocacy, in 2010 RAA launched a new policy, Mobility for Life, which embraces the use of all forms of transport, at all stages of life. RAA Security Services was rebranded Secure Services as demand increased for Personal Alert Systems among retirees, which are worn as a pendant and activated in the event of an emergency to summon help. This reflected a changing RAA, offering services beyond motoring.

Offices
RAA has branches in the Adelaide central business district, Mile End, Elizabeth, Modbury, Marion, Morphett Vale, West Lakes.

Regional Centres
RAA has offices in Berri, Clare, Kadina, Mount Barker, Mount Gambier, Murray Bridge, Naracoorte, Port Augusta, Port Lincoln, Port Pirie, Renmark, Tanunda, Victor Harbor, Whyalla, Broken Hill (New South Wales).

References

External links
RAA website

Financial services companies established in 1903
1903 establishments in Australia
Insurance companies of Australia
Organisations based in Australia with royal patronage
Automobile associations in Australia
Transport in South Australia
Emergency road services